The goalball competition for men at the 2005 Islamic Solidarity Games was contested from 14 April to 18 April at King Abdulaziz University Hall in Jeddah, Saudi Arabia. Iran defeated Algeria 7-3 in the final to clinch gold medal.

Group stage

Group A

Group B

Group C

Group D

Knockout round

Quarter-finals

Semi-finals

Gold medal match

Bronze medal match

References

2005 Islamic Solidarity Games
Goalball competitions